John Sokolosky (April 2, 1956 – October 17, 2013) was an American football center. He played for the Detroit Lions in 1978.

He died on October 17, 2013, in Shelby Township, Michigan at age 57.

References

1956 births
2013 deaths
American football centers
Wayne State Warriors football players
Detroit Lions players